Callicore cynosura, the BD butterfly or Cynosura eighty-eight, is a species of butterfly of the family Nymphalidae. The common name refers to the markings on the underside of the hindwings, which resemble the letters "B" and "D". It is found in Amazonia, from Colombia to Brazil, and to Peru and Bolivia.

The wingspan is about 47 mm. The upperside of the wings is black, banded with brilliant red.

The larvae feed on Sapindaceae species. They are green, with short spikes at the tip of the abdomen, and a pair of barbed spikes projecting forward from the head.

Subspecies
Callicore cynosura cynosura (Colombia, Ecuador, Peru, Bolivia, Brazil (Amazonas))
Callicore cynosura amazona (Bates, 1864) (Brazil (Pará))
Callicore cynosura fulva (Dillon, 1948) (Brazil (Amazonas))

References

Biblidinae
Nymphalidae of South America
Butterflies described in 1847